Mount Crow is a mountain just east of Mount McClung in the Ford Ranges of Marie Byrd Land. It was discovered and mapped by the United States Antarctic Service (1939–41), and named by the Advisory Committee on Antarctic Names for Lieutenant J.L. Crow, MC, U.S. Navy, officer in charge at Byrd Station, 1963.

References
 

Mountains of Marie Byrd Land
Mountains